Leonor, Princess of Asturias has received titles, decorations, and honorary appointments as heir presumptive to the throne of Spain.

Titles and styles

 31 October 200519 June 2014: Her Royal Highness Infanta Leonor of Spain
 19 June 2014present: Her Royal Highness The Princess of Asturias
In former Crown of Aragon territories: Her Royal Highness The Princess of Girona
In former Kingdom of Navarre territory: Her Royal Highness The Princess of Viana

She is also the Duchess of Montblanc, Countess of Cervera and Lady of Balaguer.

Honours

Spanish Honours
 : 1,201st Knight with Collar of the Order of the Golden Fleece (30 October 2015, presented 30 January 2018).

See also
 List of titles and honours of Juan Carlos I of Spain
 List of titles and honours of Queen Sofia of Spain
 List of titles and honours of Felipe VI 
 List of titles and honours of Queen Letizia of Spain
 List of honours of the Spanish royal family by country

References

Lists of titles by person of Spain
Spanish monarchy